Ugolsky is a rural locality (a khutor) in Otrozhkinskoye Rural Settlement, Serafimovichsky District, Volgograd Oblast, Russia. The population was 86 as of 2010. There are 3 streets.

Geography 
Ugolsky is located 90 km southeast of Serafimovich (the district's administrative centre) by road. Otrozhki is the nearest rural locality.

References 

Rural localities in Serafimovichsky District